Augirein is a commune in the Ariège department in the Occitanie region of south-western France.

The inhabitants of the commune are known as Augirenois or Augirenoises.

Geography

Augirein is located in the former province of Couserans some 30 km south-east of Saint-Gaudens and 25 km west by south-west of Saint-Girons. Access to the commune is by road D618 from Saint-Lary in the west which passes through the north of the commune and the village and continues east to Orgibet. Just east of the village is the hamlet of Terrefete. The commune is almost all rugged and heavily forested except for a small area in the north where the village is.

The Bouigane river flows through the north of the commune from west to east and continues to join the Lez at Audressein. The Ruisseau de Nede rises south of the commune and flows through the centre from south to north to join the Bouigane on the north-eastern border of the commune. Several tributaries rise in the commune and join the Ruisseau de Nede including the Ruisseau de Couledoux and the Ruisseau des Souls.

Neighbouring communes and villages

Administration

List of Successive Mayors

Demography
In 2017 the commune had 76 inhabitants.

Sites and monuments
The Church contains a Chalice (19th century) which is registered as a historical object.

See also
Communes of the Ariège department

References

External links
Augirein on the old IGN website 
Augirein on Géoportail, National Geographic Institute (IGN) website 
Auguren on the 1750 Cassini Map

Communes of Ariège (department)